Adam Erik Carlén (born 27 June 2000) is a Swedish footballer who plays for IFK Göteborg as a centre-back.

References

2000 births
Living people
Swedish footballers
Association football midfielders
Degerfors IF players
IFK Göteborg players
Superettan players
Allsvenskan players
Sweden under-21 international footballers